USCGC Acushnet (WMEC-167) was a cutter of the United States Coast Guard, homeported in Ketchikan, Alaska. She was originally USS Shackle (ARS-9), a  rescue and salvage ship commissioned by the United States Navy for service in World War II. She was responsible for coming to the aid of stricken vessels and received three battle stars during World War II, before a long career with the Coast Guard. Acushnet patrolled the waters of the North Pacific and was one of the last World War II era ships on active duty in the US fleet upon her retirement in 2011.

United States Navy service - 1944 to 1946

USS Shackle was laid down on 26 October 1942 by the Basalt Rock Company in Napa, California. Launched on 1 April 1943, it was sponsored by Mrs. Walker Cochran; and commissioned on 5 February 1944, with Lieutenant Charles G. Jenkins Jr. in command. At the time of its building, the country was at war and in need of more naval vessels. As a result of the necessity, three ships, identified only as "naval auxiliaries" underwent construction. The project took less than a year to complete and would become fleet rescue and salvage vessels serving in the Pacific Theater. All vessels would later become Coast Guard cutters.

Shackles first station was at Pearl Harbor, Hawaii, where she served as a salvage ship in the West Pacific throughout the remainder of World War II. Shackles first year was spent completing extensive salvage assignments clearing wreckage in the channels at Pearl Harbor and Midway Island. The vessel spent the rest of the year in Guam, Eniwetok, Tinian and Saipan.

On February 15, 1945, Shackle sailed for the invasion of Iwo Jima where it successfully completed over 44 diving and salvage assignments. During March 1945, Shackle served as a supporting unit for the Okinawa invasion. Between D-Day (April 1, 1945) and September 20, 1945, the ship completed 55 salvage and rescue operations on larger naval craft damaged by kamikaze attacks. There were 108 general alarms during the period.

Shackle was also assigned to mine sweeping operations in the East China Sea where over 200 enemy mines of all types were sunk or destroyed. Shackle also cleared the vital docking area of the wreckage of sunken Japanese cable laying ship at Yokosuka Naval Base, Tokyo Bay, Japan. During all of these operations the Shackle suffered no damage or casualties. As part of her service in the Pacific Theater,  Shackle received three World War II battle stars, the WWII Victory Medal, the Asiatic-Pacific Campaign Medal, the American Campaign Medal, and the Navy Occupation Service Medal.

On August 23, 1946 USS Shackle was commissioned into the United States Coast Guard as USCGC Acushnet (WAT-167), a search and rescue vessel and was homeported in Portland, Maine.

Transfer to the United States Coast Guard - 1946
She remained at San Diego, California, until ordered to San Francisco, California, where, on 29 June, she was decommissioned and transferred to the Coast Guard. First homeported in Portland, Maine, as a Coast Guard tug, and renamed USCGC Acushnet (WAT-167), she earned a sound reputation as a dependable friend to fishermen and boaters in distress.

North East and International Ice Patrol Service - 1946 to 1968
While in Portland, Maine Acushnet became a friend to the maritime community with her search-and-rescue endeavors. While in Maine, Acushnet not only served as a vessel for SAR, but also as part of the International Ice Patrol. Acushnet and her role in the International Ice patrol was featured in the April 22nd 1957 edition of Life Magazine. Between 1946 and 1959, Acushnet responded to a major fire in Bar Harbor, Maine, salvaged a vessel that ran aground in the Kennebec River, and assisted two tankers that broke in half during a violent storm.

On 18 February 1952, Acushnet participated in what is listed as the ten most significant Coast Guard rescues. The ships collided twice and the merchant seamen jumped to the safety of Acushnets fantail.

In the year 1950, Acushnet became active in the International Ice Patrol and spent a total of seven patrol months sharing that responsibility with the cutters Androscoggin and Evergreen. Acushnets salvage gear was removed in late 1959 and replaced with search-and-rescue gear. A few of Acushnets more noteworthy cases during that time frame include the following: in 1960, it salvaged the 300-ton USCGC General Greene which had been driven one hundred yards ashore in high winds.

Redesignated as an oceanographic ship - 1968 to 1971
Redesignated an oceanographic ship, WAGO-167, on July 8, 1968, and assigned to oceanographic, meteorological, and polar operations, she commenced duties as a research support ship. During fiscal year 1970, she underwent conversion during which alterations were made to her hull and scientific equipment, and research and storage spaces were added at a shipyard in San Diego, California. As part of the National Data Buoy Project of NOAA Acushnet spent three years attached to the Office of Naval Research and the Scripps Oceanographic Institute in San Diego, California. Her primary mission on eleven extended deployments through June 1971, the cutter aided in positioning buoys. While serving as a WAGO, Acushnet assisted in only one rescue case a medevac in 1970.

Caribbean service – 1971 to 1990
In July 1971, Acushnet transferred to the Gulf Coast; and, based at Gulfport, Mississippi, she continued her oceanographic work with the National Data Buoy Center, this time aiding the Mississippi Test Facility. On August 24, 1971 Acushnet, affectionately known to the crew a "NOAA's Ark", arrived in Gulfport with 64 crew and a 100-ton buoy that was towed from San Diego as its first new support assignment.

Once established in Gulfport, Acushnet continued to play a diverse and important role in the search-and-rescue mission. In the fall of 1973 the cutter played a major role in the Key Largo fire south of New Orleans opposite the town of Phoenix. Acushnet was again called to respond after a collision on the Mississippi River. Acushnet and the cutter Dependable were presented the Coast Guard Unit Commendation for extinguishing a fire on the tanker Key Trader after it collided with another vessel, the Norwegian ore ship Baune, and burst into flames in the river.

Between the years 1975 and 1978, Acushnet conducted search-and-rescue research of the Gulf of Mexico shelf area, conducted the first marriage on board a Coast Guard vessel since the mid-19th century, and made her first drug seizure of 18 tons of marijuana and 21 smugglers.

In late 1978, the cutter embarked on a patrol to participate in the Global Weather Experiment, 140-nation effort to gather worldwide weather information. For this operation Acushnet received the Meritorious Unit Commendation. Additionally in 1978, Acushnet was designated a Medium Endurance Cutter (WMEC 167) and was formally assigned law enforcement and search-and-rescue missions.

In August–September 1979, Mobile, Alabama, was hit by Hurricane Frederic while Acushnet was there in drydock, although no damage occurred to the cutter. Her first patrol out of drydock was immediately canceled and Acushnet was sent to pick up survivors of a collision between an oil tanker and a merchant vessel.

From May 17 to June 6, 1980, Acushnet participated in the largest immigration crisis in the history of the Coast Guard, the Mariel Boat Lift from Cuba. The cutter escorted the vessel Red Diamond with 800 refugees into Key West. In addition, she assisted 35 boats, aided 120 refugees directly, and fueled two 41-foot Coast Guard boats. For her efforts, the cutter received the Humanitarian Service Award. During its time in Gulfport, Acushnet interdicted nearly 200 Cuban and Haitian refugees, retrieving some of them from shark-infested waters.

Drug interdiction during the rest of the '80s 'proved to be successful. In 1980, Acushnet seized 52 tons of marijuana. Between September and November of the same year, Acushnet confiscated marijuana on 7 vessels totaling a seizure of over 76 tons. Between 1987 and 1989 Acushnet had yet two more seizures of marijuana and hashish oil valued at over 1.5 million. m/v Blind Melon and sloop Stormy Weather.

West Coast service - 1990 to 1998
Acushnet moved to Eureka, California in July 1990. During a September patrol, a lookout spotted floating objects in the water. These "objects" were the three crew members of the fishing boat Miss Patty, which had capsized before it could radio for help. During Operation Sandtrap in July 1991, Acushnet intercepted the sailing vessel Malekula carrying twelve tons of hashish from Indochina. The cutter pulled 32 bales from the burning and sinking Malekula, despite efforts by smugglers to scuttle the sailboat.

In October 1991, Acushnet made her first trip to the waters of Alaska. The cutter was diverted for two weeks to coordinate anti-pollution efforts when the 518-foot Hyundai No. 12 ran hard aground near the Shumagin Islands. She also responded to a mayday call made by the fishing vessel Tonquin in the Gulf of Alaska, rescuing one man out of a five-man crew from stormy and frigid waters during a five-day search. The cutter coordinated a search involving several fishing boats and a tanker in the area. As a result, three additional crew members were rescued.

Alaska/Bering Sea Patrol service - 1999 to 2011
As the majority of Acushnets patrols became Alaska Patrols, in 1998 she moved to Ketchikan, Alaska, where she was employed in law enforcement, fisheries, and search and rescue missions in Alaska. This considerably shortened her transit time to the Bering Sea.

On 23 February 2007 Acushnet was designated as the "oldest commissioned cutter" in the fleet following the decommissioning of USCGC Storis. She carries gold hull numbers to show this distinction, and the formal title of "Queen Of The Fleet". She was scheduled for decommissioning in late 2008. In March 2008 letters to the editor appeared in the Boston Herald and Maine Sunday Telegram calling for Boston and Portland to consider the Acushnet as a possible museum ship. The 2008 decommissioning was canceled and Acushnet continued to conduct patrols in Alaska until March 2011 when she was auctioned as surplus property by the GSA.

Decommissioning

On 11 March 2011, Acushnet was decommissioned and retired from active duty after more than 67 years of service.
 succeeded Acushnet as the Coast Guard's oldest commissioned cutter.
According to the Juneau Empire Acushnets duties would be undertaken by a new Fast Response Cutter.
According to the Coast Guard's 2010 budget the replacement Fast Response Cutter was not scheduled for arrival in Ketchikan until 2014.

In 2022, Acushnet was acquired by Blue Water Overwatch, LLC, to serve as the flagship of their training program.  Acushnet is currently undergoing restoration in Anacortes, WA and is scheduled for additional maintenance in drydock in 2023.

Awards and honors
Acushnet has been rewarded for outstanding service on many occasions. Her decorations include:

 Presidential Unit Citation
 Secretary of Transportation Outstanding Unit Award
 2 Coast Guard Unit Commendations
 6 Coast Guard Meritorious Unit Commendations
 Coast Guard E Ribbon
 Coast Guard Bicentennial Unit Commendation
 American Campaign Medal
 Asiatic-Pacific Campaign Medal with 3 battle stars
 World War II Victory Medal
 Navy Occupation Service Medal with "Asia" Clasp
 4 National Defense Service Medals
 Global War on Terrorism Service Medal
 2 Humanitarian Service Medals
 Transportation 9-11 Ribbon
 2 Special Operations Service Ribbons

References

External links
History of the Shackle and Acushnet
NavSource Online: Service Ship Photo Archive - ARS-9 Shackle - WAT-167 / WAGO-167 / WMEC-167 Acushnet
USCGC Acushnet unit website
The Model Shipwright page with ship's plan drawings
Photos on picryl

Ships of the United States Coast Guard
Historic American Engineering Record in Alaska
Medium endurance cutters
Research vessels of the United States
Ships built in Napa, California
1943 ships